Laycock Railway Cutting is a 1.3 hectare geological Site of Special Scientific Interest near Milborne Port in Somerset, notified in 1993. It is a Geological Conservation Review site.

Laycock Railway Cutting is the best single exposure of the Bathonian ’Fuller's Earth Rock’ in South Somerset. Ammonites indicating the Morrisi and Subcontractus zones of the Middle Bathonian are frequent. Ammonites are generally
extremely rare at this level in Britain and their presence at Laycock is of international stratigraphic importance.
The combination of features of both litho- and chrono-stratigraphical importance make Laycock Railway Cutting a key British Bathonian locality.

Sources
 English Nature citation sheet for the site (accessed 10 August 2006)

External links
 English Nature website (SSSI information)

Sites of Special Scientific Interest in Somerset
Sites of Special Scientific Interest notified in 1993
Railway cuttings in the United Kingdom
Rail transport in Somerset
Geology of Somerset